Sunday Omobolanle aka Papi Luwe ,  MON (born October 1, 1954) is a Nigerian comic actor, playwright, film director, and producer.

Early life and career
He was born on October 1, 1954 at Ilora, a town in Oyo State southwestern Nigeria.
He is the father of Sunkanmi Omobolanle, a Nigerian film actor and director.
Sunday Omobolanle had scripted, directed, produced and featured in several Nigerian film such as Adun Ewuro, a 2011 Nigerian film that featured Adebayo Salami.
In recognition of his contributions to the Nigerian film industry, he was bestowed with a National award, MON by Olusegun Obasanjo, the former president of the Federal Republic of Nigeria.

Filmography

Adun Ewuro (2011)
Konkobilo
Oba Alatise
Anikulapo

References

Living people
Nigerian male film actors
Yoruba male actors
1954 births
Male actors in Yoruba cinema
20th-century Nigerian male actors
21st-century Nigerian male actors
Ogunmola family
Nigerian male television actors
Nigerian dramatists and playwrights
People from Oyo State
Members of the Order of the Niger
Nigerian film directors
Nigerian film producers
20th-century births